Diamantina "Dina" Georgatou (born 9 May 1986) is a former Greek diver. She competed in the synchronised 3 metre springboard, along with Sotiria Koutsopetrou, and the 3 metre springboard events at the 2004 Summer Olympics in Athens.

References

External links

1986 births
Living people
Greek female divers
Divers at the 2004 Summer Olympics
Olympic divers of Greece